Francisco de Meneses Brito (died 1672) was Royal Governor of Chile between 1664 and 1667.

Biography 
Born in Cádiz in 1615, was the son of Alonso de Meneses and Catalina Corbalán de Castilla. His wife was Catalina Bravo, daughter of Francisco Bravo de Saravia Ovalle (1st Marquess of la Pica) and Marcela Henestrosa Sáenz de Mena.

Sources

1672 deaths
Royal Governors of Chile
Spanish generals
Spanish military personnel
17th-century Spanish people
Year of birth unknown
1615 births